Joannes Rualdus or Jean Ruault (1570? - 1636) was a French scholar who compiled a Life of Plutarchus which was prefixed to the Paris Edition of 1624, in two volumes folio, of Plutarch's works.

References

French scholars
French male writers
1636 deaths
Year of birth uncertain